The 2014 Rawalpindi suicide bombing was a suicide bombing in Rawalpindi, Pakistan, on January 19, 2014.

History
Six military personnel and eight civilians were killed in a suicide bombing in a town near the headquarters of the Pakistan Army. According to the BBC, "Soldiers and paramilitary forces were planning to leave the town of Bannu, in Khyber Pakhtunkhwa province, for Razmak in North Waziristan, when their convoy was hit by the blast." Also according to the BBC, "Police say a group of soldiers had been passing on foot at the moment of Monday's explosion in Rawalpindi."

References

2014 murders in Pakistan
21st-century mass murder in Pakistan
Attacks in Pakistan in 2014
Mass murder in 2014
Terrorist incidents in Pakistan in 2014
Suicide bombings in Pakistan
Terrorist incidents in Rawalpindi
Crime in Punjab, Pakistan
Tehrik-i-Taliban Pakistan attacks
History of Rawalpindi